Sugar Ray is an American rock band formed in Newport Beach, California, in 1986. Originally playing heavier funk metal and nu metal style music, the band achieved mainstream popularity in 1997 with their more pop-influenced single "Fly". The song's success led the band to shift its style dramatically to the more radio-friendly pop sound with their subsequent releases. Their best-selling album, 14:59, was released in 1999, and featured popular singles "Every Morning", "Someday", followed by a self-titled album in 2001 featuring the single "When It's Over". The band would release two further albums, In the Pursuit of Leisure (2003) and Music for Cougars (2009), though the albums and respective singles generally sold far less. The band continued to tour into the 2010s.

In 2019, ten years after the band's last album, they announced their seventh studio album, Little Yachty, in June 2019. The lead single, "Make It Easy", was released the same month.

History

Formation and Lemonade and Brownies (1986–1996)
The band members grew up in Orange County, California. Rodney Sheppard played in a number of reggae bands, including working with future Good Charlotte drummer Dean Butterworth. In the late 1980s, prior to Sugar Ray, Sheppard and Stan Frazier played together in a band under the name The Tories. Later additions Murphy Karges and Mark McGrath changed the band's name to Shrinky Dinx – they were initially named Shrinky Dinks. After signing with Atlantic Records, the name was changed to Sugar Ray upon threat of a lawsuit from the Milton Bradley Company, maker of the Shrinky Dinks toy.

The band's debut album, Lemonade and Brownies, was released in 1995 and though it failed to produce a major hit single it did earn them recognition in alternative circles.

After they gained fame with the 1997 album Floored in 1998, the single "Speed Home California" and "Mean Machine" from Lemonade and Brownies was featured in the PlayStation game Road Rash 3D, and its Nintendo 64 counterpart Road Rash 64, respectively.

Floored (1997–1998)
Sugar Ray's first mainstream hit came in the summer of 1997 with their song "Fly", which was released from the album Floored and featured reggae musician Super Cat. "Fly" did not sound anything at all like the rest of the tracks on the album and received frequent radio play, resulting in a number one rank on the Billboard's Airplay List. As a result of the success of "Fly", Floored sold well and was certified double platinum. However, by the end of 1997, critics were skeptical that Sugar Ray could put out another successful song and labeled them a one-hit wonder. The same year, Sugar Ray was featured in the movie Father's Day, starring Billy Crystal and Robin Williams.

14:59 (1999–2000)
Their 1999 album 14:59 was the band's reply to suggestions that they were a one-hit wonder, with the title implying that their 15 minutes of fame were not quite up — their "fame clock" read 14:59. "Every Morning", which was widely compared to "Fly", had similar success during the spring of 1999, reaching number 3 on the U.S. Billboard Hot 100 chart. Their follow-up single "Someday" also enjoyed extensive airplay later that year and reached number 7 in the U.S. The next follow-up single "Falls Apart (Run Away)" reached number 29 in early 2000. 14:59 outsold its predecessor and was certified triple platinum. The band toured in support of the album, and were scheduled to perform at Woodstock 99. However, Mark fell ill and they had to cancel. After 14:59 in 2000, Sugar Ray teamed up with The Alkaholiks to contribute the track "Make Room" on the Rap Rock collaboration album, Loud Rocks, with other artists with a similar style such as Crazy Town and Incubus. In 2000, Sugar Ray did a cover version of John Cale and Brian Eno's song "Spinning Away" for the soundtrack to the film The Beach.

Sugar Ray (2001–2002)
Their 2001 self-titled album Sugar Ray produced another hit with "When It's Over", which, although it failed to achieve the same level of success as their previous singles, still reached number 13 in the U.S. Other singles such as "Answer the Phone", "Under the Sun" and "Words to Me" gained some popularity as well. Sugar Ray also made several movie appearances, including Scooby-Doo in 2002.

In the Pursuit of Leisure (2003–2005)
Sugar Ray's 2003 effort In the Pursuit of Leisure, and the first single from the album, "Mr. Bartender (It's So Easy)", received a lukewarm reception. The album also contained the band's cover of Joe Jackson's famous "Is She Really Going Out With Him?". ProHoeZak guested live with the band in 2003 having appeared on "Mr. Bartender (It's So Easy)". In 2005, Sugar Ray released a greatest hits album, with three new songs, "Shot of Laughter", "Time After Time", and "Psychedelic Bee".

Inactivity and Music for Cougars (2006–2009)
After releasing their greatest hits album – The Best of Sugar Ray, in 2005, the band went into a period of relative inactivity for a number of years, with Mark McGrath starting a new job as an anchor on the television show Extra. In January 2006, Sugar Ray was released from their recording contract with Atlantic Records. In mid-2007, their previously unreleased song "Into Yesterday" was used on the Surf's Up movie soundtrack, and the band made brief tour in Asia in August 2007 where they headlined SingFest, Singapore's first international music festival.

Sugar Ray appeared on the May 18, 2008, season 3 finale of American Dad!, titled "Spring Break-Up", as themselves, playing "Fly" at a Spring Break party.

On May 19, 2008, the band announced they would be entering the studio to record their first album of new material since 2003. Jason Bernard, a friend of the band (who also happened to be a music producer) brought them a deal to sign with his label. It was announced that the band signed Pulse Recordings and that the new album should be released in the summer of 2009. On March 6, 2009, Mark McGrath announced that the new album would be titled Music for Cougars. It was released on July 21, 2009. The first single was "Boardwalk".

Some critics noted that McGrath aimed to lower people's expectations for the album during its promotion by saying things like: "I know people aren't sitting on the edge of their seats waiting for a Sugar Ray album, but that wasn't the point." In another interview, Murphy Karges, bassist said, "We've never had any credibility. Nobody ever gave us any so how could we lose any?"

Lineup changes and 1990s nostalgia touring (2010–2017)
On August 22, 2010, Sugar Ray's Twitter page announced that Craig "DJ Homicide" Bullock had left the band. In 2011, the band had what McGrath described as not "the highest-grossing year for Sugar Ray". Murphy Karges and Stan Frazier also left, one not wanting to tour anymore, and the other taking a job with Aaron Rodgers. This left Rodney Sheppard and McGrath as the remaining original members. The band recruited replacements in percussionist Al Keith, bassist Justin Bivona and drummer Jesse Bivona, the latter two being touring support members in the past. 

In 2012, McGrath worked with Art Alexakis, frontman and vocalist of the band Everclear, on starting up a 1990s nostalgia tour, something they had discussed in the past but had always felt was too soon to be successful. The result was the "Summerland" tour, featuring a line-up of alternative rock bands that "at least had a big hit or two" in the 1990s, containing McGrath and Alexakis's own bands along with Marcy Playground, Gin Blossoms, and Lit. Percussionist Al Keith (Khalil Al-Rashad) injured his foot on July 2, 2012 at Del Mar Fairgrounds in Del Mar, California, during the song "Fly". He was absent from shows until August 2012. The tour was deemed a success, and McGrath initially spoke of the possibility of it becoming a yearly event. Initial plans to expand the nostalgia touring into 2013 faced issues. McGrath announced a "Mark McGrath & Friends" tour, in which the band would perform alongside other 1990s alternative rock bands Smash Mouth, Spin Doctors, and Vertical Horizon, on a cruise ship. though the plans were cancelled, with the idea losing support after the Carnival Triumph cruise ship disaster. Additionally, McGrath and Alexakis did not see eye to eye on the future direction for the "Summerland" tour, leading to Sugar Ray leaving its 2013 incarnation in favor of starting their own rival nostalgia tour called "Under the Sun" instead. The tour ran three separate years – 2013, 2014, and 2015.

As early as 2013, McGrath spoke of recording and releasing an EP, though at the time, he was unsure if it would be released as a band release or a solo release. On April 9, 2013, Mark McGrath announced via Twitter that he would be "heading to Pulse Recording Studios" to record the new material, he stated July to be a hopeful release date. For the tour, and drummer Jesse Bivona and bassist Justin Bivona were temporarily replaced by drummer Dean Butterworth and bassist Serg Dimitrijevic, as the Bivona brothers' band The Interrupters are opening for Rancid. On September 9, 2013, former members Stan Frazier (drums, percussion, programming, backing vocals) and Murphy Karges (bass guitar, backing vocals) performed with Scott Foster (lead vocals, guitar), Lewis Richards (guitar, backing vocals), and Damon Tucker (guitar, backing vocals) during Keep Calm and Beat H.E.A.T. Rocking & Rally. They performed some of Foster's solo material, and some Sugar Ray classics. They performed from 5:00 p.m. to 8:00 p.m. at Twila Reid Park, 3100 West Orange Avenue, Anaheim. On November 9, 2013, Sugar Ray was to play a benefit for the Greater Los Angeles Fisher House
at West LA's Wadsworth Theater.

The band continued its "Under the Sun" tour through 2014. However, in June 2014, McGrath revealed that the band had been struggling with legal wranglings with Karges and Frazier since their departure in 2012, and that because of it, he felt there would never be another Sugar Ray album. McGrath would later release the EP as a solo EP entitled Summertime's Coming in 2015. As of the fall of 2014, drummer Jesse Bivona and bassist Justin Bivona are no longer in Sugar Ray (leaving officially in 2016); drummer Dean Butterworth became a full member in fall 2014, while bassist Kristian Attard became a full member in 2016.

In August 2017, McGrath spoke of writing and recording another album, which he hoped he would be able to release within the next year.

Little Yachty (2019–present)
In June 2019, ten years after the band last released music, Sugar Ray signed with BMG Rights Management and announced a new album, Little Yachty; with the lead single "Make it Easy" debuting on June 7, 2019. The album title is a reference to both the rapper Lil Yachty and the fact that McGrath views Sugar Ray as a "yacht rock" band. The album was released on July 26, 2019.

Musical style
Sugar Ray originally began their career as a hardcore punk band, before introducing a DJ into the band's musical composition, resulting in their first shift in style. This new sound fused glam metal and hardcore punk with funk, sample-based hip-hop, new wave, disco, dub, reggae, R&B and soul music. This sound has been predominantly categorized as nu metal and funk metal, as well as alternative metal, hard rock, punk rock and rap metal. Music critic Stephen Thomas Erlewine says that after the success of their crossover hit "Fly" they "no longer tried to ape the Red Hot Chili Peppers." Regarding the band's first two albums, singer Mark McGrath stated, "we were the Chili Peppers with zero talent. [...] Out of necessity we kind of became known as a metal band, a little pre nu-metal type rap rock thing before there was rap rock."

Sugar Ray shifted to a pop rock sound following the mainstream success of "Fly", beginning with their third album 14:59. The band's later music has also been categorized as skate punk, pop, and alternative pop. The band's new sound occasionally incorporated elements of genres such as power pop and disco. The band's overall sound, throughout its shifts in style, has been characterized as alternative rock. The band's music is generally tongue-in-cheek.

Band members

Current members
 Rodney Sheppard – lead guitar, backing vocals, ukulele (1986–present)
 Mark McGrath – lead vocals, rhythm guitar, additional percussion (1986–present)
 Dean Butterworth – drums, percussion, programming, backing vocals (touring substitute 2013–2014; 2014–present)
 Kristian Attard – bass guitar, backing vocals, keyboards (touring substitute 2014–2016; 2016–present)

Touring substitutes
 Nic Edwards Stewart – drums, percussion, backing vocals (1996)
 Serg Dimitrijevic – bass guitar, backing vocals (2013–2014)
 Tim Hutton – bass guitar, backing vocals (2015, 2018)
 Jason Ganberg – drums, percussion, backing vocals (2016, 2017, 2018)

Former members
 Stan Frazier – drums, percussion, additional guitar, programming, backing vocals (1986–2012)
 Murphy Karges – bass guitar, backing vocals, additional guitar (1986–2012)
 Craig "DJ Homicide" Bullock – turntables, samples, additional programming, keyboards, backing vocals (1995–2010)
 Al Keith – percussion, vibes (2010–2013)
 Jesse Bivona – drums, percussion, programming, backing vocals (touring substitute 2011, 2018; 2012–2016)
 Justin Bivona – bass guitar, backing vocals (touring substitute 2011; 2012–2016)

Touring guests
 ProHoeZak – vocals (2003)

Timeline

Discography

 Lemonade and Brownies (1995)
 Floored (1997)
 14:59 (1999)
 Sugar Ray (2001)
 In the Pursuit of Leisure (2003)
 Music for Cougars (2009)
 Little Yachty (2019)

References

External links

 

Alternative rock groups from California
Musical groups from Orange County, California
Atlantic Records artists
American pop rock music groups
American funk metal musical groups
American alternative metal musical groups
Nu metal musical groups from California
Punk rock groups from California